Highway 33 is a minor two- to four-lane highway connecting the Boundary Country and Okanagan regions of British Columbia, Canada.  Highway 33, which is 129 km (80 mi) long, connects Rock Creek, on the Crowsnest Highway (Highway 3), north to Kelowna, on the Okanagan Highway, partially following the West Kettle River.  It is also the main access to the Big White Ski Resort, which is near the apex of the pass between the head of the West Kettle and metropolitan Kelowna.  The only other visible community on Highway 33 is Beaverdell, 48 km (30 mi) north of Rock Creek.  Highway 33 opened in 1970.

Major intersections

See also
Kettle Valley Railway

References

External links
 Official Numbered Routes in British Columbia by British Columbia Driving & Transportation

Boundary Country
033
Highways in the Okanagan
Transport in Kelowna